Tissimans was a clothing company located in Bishop's Stortford, Hertfordshire, England founded in 1601 
 it ceased trading on 28 February 2013.

References 

Manufacturing companies of England
Companies established in 1601
British companies disestablished in 2013
Companies based in East Hertfordshire District
1601 establishments in England
2013 disestablishments in England